Theodore R. Newman Jr. (July 5, 1934 – January 6, 2023) was an American judge of the District of Columbia Court of Appeals. He served as the first black chief judge of the court.

Biography 
Newman was born in Birmingham and raised in Tuskegee, Alabama, where his father was a Methodist minister and his mother was a schoolteacher. He graduated from the Mount Herman School for Boys, a boarding school in Massachusetts, in 1951. He went on to earn a bachelor's degree in philosophy from Brown University in 1955 and a law degree from Harvard Law School in 1958. After law school he spent three years as a judge advocate in the United States Air Force stationed in France. On his return to the United States, he moved to Washington, D.C., to work at the United States Department of Justice Civil Rights Division from September 1961 to August 1962. He then entered private practice as an associate at Houston, Bryant & Gardner, a prominent law firm founded by Charles Hamilton Houston and Wendell P. Gardner Sr., where his colleagues included future federal judge William B. Bryant.

In 1970, Newman was named to the Superior Court of the District of Columbia, and in 1976 he was elevated to the D.C. Court of Appeals and designated its new chief judge. He was the first black chief judge of any state-level court system in the United States. At the time, there were fewer than a dozen black judges serving on state appeals courts. In 1979, Ebony named Newman among the one hundred most influential black Americans.

Newman's first term as chief judge expired in 1980, and his attempt to be redesignated for a second term was controversial. The more conservative wing of the court, led by Judge Frank Q. Nebeker, opposed Newman's reappointment, arguing that his behavior at oral argument, at meetings, and outside of court was unbecoming of a judge. In the end Newman was reappointed by the District of Columbia Judicial Nomination Commission for a second four-year term and did not seek reappointment in 1984. In 1991 Newman took senior status, and in 2016 he retired from the court. His former law clerks include law professors Angela J. Davis and Wendy Gordon.

Newman died on January 6, 2023, at the age of 88.

References 

1934 births
2023 deaths
20th-century African-American people
20th-century American judges
21st-century African-American people
21st-century American judges
African-American judges
Brown University alumni
Harvard Law School alumni
Judges of the District of Columbia Court of Appeals
Judges of the Superior Court of the District of Columbia
Lawyers from Birmingham, Alabama
United States Department of Justice lawyers